Ranoji Shinde the founder of the Scindia dynasty from maratha caste that produced outstanding Maratha military commanders during the 18th century. Later the Scindia served as vassals of the British from the northern Princely state of Gwalior.

Early life 
Ranoji Scindia belonged to a Marathi family. The family held hereditary rights as the Patil  of Kanherkhed  village in present day Satara district in the Indian state of Maharashtra. The Shinde family in the previous centuries had served as shiledars (cavalrymen) under the Bahmani Sultanate.

Career
Ranoji as a young man started in the service of Balaji Vishwanath Peshwa. 
At that time Ramchandrababa Sukhtankar, a diplomat of the Peshwa recognised Ranoji's talents and got him appointed as the personal servant of the Peshwa's son, Bajirao I.
Upon the death of his father, Bajirao was appointed as the Peshwa at the age of twenty by Chhatrapati Shahu. This evoked jealousy from senior officials at the Maratha court. This in turn led Baji Rao to promote as commanders of his troops, talented young men who were barely out of teens such as Ranoji, Malhar Rao Holkar, the Pawar brothers, Pilaji Jadhav,and Fateh Singh Bhosle. None of these men belonged to families that held hereditary Deshmukhi rights under earlier rulers such as the Deccan Sultanates.
Ranoji along with Malharrao Holkar and Pawar brothers was in charge of the Maratha campaign initiated by Peshwa Bajirao in Malwa in 1726. Ranoji established his capital at Ujjain in 1731. He appointed RamchandraBaba Sukhtankar as his Diwan or administrator and Made Yashaji Rambhaji as Sarsenapati of his Army then spent most of his life on Maratha military campaigns. Some historians credit Sukhtankar with bringing the Kumbh mela to Ujjain in 1732.
 An early account of the Haridwar Kumbh Mela was published by Captain Thomas Hardwicke in 1796 CE.

Family
Ranoji had five sons, namely, Jayajirao, Jyotibarao, Dattajirao, Tukojirao, and Mahadji Shinde. the first four died fighting in various battles in northern India between 1750-1761. Mahadji, the youngest had an illustrious career in the second half of the 18th century.
His descendants during British colonial (1818-1947) were the rulers of the Princely state of Gwalior.

See also
Scindia

References

1745 deaths
Indian generals
Ranoji
People from Shajapur
Year of birth unknown